Schlumpf is a surname. It is also the German word for smurf. (See also the link to the Wiktionary entry and the German version of this page.) Notable people with the surname include:

Dominik Schlumpf (born 1991), Swiss professional ice hockey defenceman
Eveline Widmer-Schlumpf (born 1956), Swiss lawyer, politician, member of the Swiss Federal Council since 2008
Fabienne Schlumpf (born 1990), Swiss athlete specialising in the 3000 metres steeplechase and marathon running
Fritz Schlumpf (Italy, February, 1906; April 18, 1992), French Industrialist and collector of automobiles
Hans Schlumpf (born 1904; died 1989), industrialist and collector of automobiles
Leon Schlumpf (born 1925), Swiss politician and a former member of the Swiss Federal Council (1979–1987)
Martin Schlumpf (born 1947), Swiss musician
Wolfgang Schlumpf OSB (1831–1904), Swiss-born Benedictine monk and missionary in the United States

See also
 Schlumpf Collection, the 500 car collection of Fritz and Hans Schlumpf, now the Cité de l'Automobile in Mulhouse, France
Schlumpf Drive, a two-speed planetary gear bicycle bottom bracket
Chlum (disambiguation)
Slump (disambiguation)

es:Schlumpf